Wusong, formerly romanized as Woosung, is a subdistrict of Baoshan in northern Shanghai. Prior to the city's expansion, it was a separate port town located  down the Huangpu River from Shanghai's urban core.

Name

Wusong is named for the Wusong River, a former name for Shanghai's Suzhou Creek. Suzhou Creek is now a tributary to the Huangpu River, emptying into it in Puxi across from Lujiazui and just north of the Bund. The Huangpu had previously been a tributary to the Wusong, but the two reversed their importance when a flood caused it to gain a number of the Wusong's former tributaries. The location where the Huangpu and Wusong meet was generally known as Wusongkou ("mouth of the Wusong").

History
Wusong housed a Qing fortress protecting the entrance to Shanghai. It was captured by the British during the Battle of Woosung on 16 June 1842, amid the First Opium War. During the steamship era, it was the point of departure for large steamers bound for Shanghai. This position caused it to be the site of China's first telegraph wires and first railroad, both running to Shanghai along what is today the route of the Shanghai Metro's elevated Line 3. By 1900, it boasted a lighthouse and a "skeleton" teahouse, as well as a small squadron of war-junks (ty-mung) of the Imperial Chinese Navy. Tongji University was founded here in 1909.

The Battle of Shanghai represented the outbreak of World War II in Asia, and Wusongkou was the scene of an all-out land, sea and air battle, as Imperial Japanese Marines landed here on 23 August 1937, and were attacked by Chinese Air Force Hawk III fighter-attack planes escorted by P-26/281 Peashooters; the intense dogfight between the Chinese fighters and IJN fighters from aircraft carriers Hōshō and Ryūjō resulted in several Chinese fighters shot down, while the Japanese lost two A4N fighters, each claimed by Capt. Liu Cuigang and Lt. John Huang, although Capt. Liu's victim managed to nurse his crippled A4N back to Ryūjō. Wusong was later the site of an internment camp for marines captured on Wake Island after the attack on Pearl Harbor over four years later.

Wusong became a district of Shanghai, before it was abolished in 1988 and incorporated into Baoshan District.

Landmarks

The Wusung Radio Tower is a 321 metres tall guyed mast situated at Wusong near Shanghai.  The Wusung Radio Mast was built in the 1930s and was at the time of inauguration the world's second-tallest architectural structure after the Empire State Building.

Notes

References

Citations

Sources 

 .

See also
 Woosung Road
 Wenzaobang, also known as Wusong Creek
 Suzhou Creek, formerly known as the Wusong River

Township-level divisions of Shanghai
Baoshan District, Shanghai